Bodenfelde is a railway station located in Bodenfelde, Germany. The station is located on the Sollingbahn and Oberweserbahn. The train services are operated by NordWestBahn and Deutsche Bahn.

Train services
The station is served by the following services:

Local services  Bodenfelde – Northeim
Local services  Ottbergen – Bad Karlshafen – Bodenfelde – Göttingen

References

Railway stations in Lower Saxony
Buildings and structures in Northeim (district)